The Geelong Transit System (GTS) was the operating brand of public transport in Geelong, Victoria, Australia. It was a joint venture between the Kefford Corporation's Benders Busways, (since 2008 CDC Geelong) and McHarry's Buslines. From 2009, timetables and signage were branded as Geelong Transit with a standard Viclink orange theme, so it is unclear to what extent the former GTS entity still exists as such. Since 2009, GTS (or Geelong Transit) ticketing has become part of the statewide myki smartcard system.

History
Although trials of a time-based ticketing system commenced in Geelong in the early 1980s as part of a reform of transport ticketing in Victoria, it was not until 1983 that the Geelong Transit System was inaugurated. Over time, buses delivering route services in Geelong were painted in the Geelong Transit System livery of white body and blue stripes. However, after Kefford Corporation purchased Benders Busways in 2000 its buses were progressively repainted into its own green and white livery, and the other GTS operator, McHarry's Buslines, gradually followed suit, with its own overall white livery, including a red, yellow and black stripe. It became clear that after the renewal of the state government contracts governing the remaining two GTS bus operators in 2000, they were no longer required to use the common GTS livery.

From April 2006, V/Line railway tickets sold to Geelong, South Geelong and Marshall railway stations had included GTS travel, as part of the integration of the Victorian public transport fare systems before the introduction of the Myki ticketing system.

Services
The Geelong Transit System covered all government-contracted urban route buses in Geelong operated by CDC Geelong (formerly known as Benders Busways) and McHarry's Buslines, as well as V/Line rail services between Lara and Marshall stations on the Geelong line.

Ticketing

Until the introduction of the Myki ticketing system on GTS buses in March 2009, the network used a unified, time-based, multi-modal ticketing system, employing paper tickets issued by bus drivers and inspected manually. Tickets were valid for two hours, from the next full hour after they were purchased. Passengers could make unlimited transfers during the time the ticket is valid, on both urban buses and V/Line rail services within the GTS boundary. GTS tickets were not valid in conjunction with V/Line travel beyond the GTS network boundary.

The only other type of tickets available were yearly and half-yearly student bus passes, until April 2006 when V/Line railway tickets sold to Geelong, South Geelong, and Marshall railway stations started including GTS travel for no extra cost, and when daily and weekly tickets were made available in 2008.

Five types of tickets existed at the time the system was replaced:
 McHarry's bus issue: old style paper ticket
 Benders bus issue: thermally printed paper ticket
 Preprinted: paper ticket on which the valid date was clipped out
 V/Line rail ticket: standard V/Line thermal ticket with GTS code marked on it
 V/Line rail ticket: standard V/Line conductor issued ticket with GTS code marked on it

The myki smartcard ticketing system was introduced on four Geelong bus routes in December 2008, and on 2 March 2009 all Geelong and the Bellarine Peninsula bus routes were switched to myki. Short-term myki tickets were sold on Geelong buses until their use was discontinued in April 2013, in line with state government policy not to introduce them in Melbourne when its public transport system was switched to myki.

Until myki became the only valid ticket for V/Line "commuter" services, V/Line paper tickets could be used for bus travel to or from Geelong area railway stations, with no extra charge. The fare concession continued after myki was introduced on V/Line services.

References

External links
McHarry's: Geelong Transit System
Benders Busways 

Transport in Geelong